The Monumento a la Fundación de México-Tenochtitlán is installed near the government offices in the historic center of Mexico City, Mexico. The monument, designed by Carlos Marquina, was dedicated in 1970. Part of the sculpture depicts an eagle atop a cactus, eating a snake, similar to the imagery on the flag of Mexico.

References

External links

 

1970 establishments in Mexico
1970 sculptures
Sculptures of birds
Historic center of Mexico City
Monuments and memorials in Mexico City
Outdoor sculptures in Mexico City
Snakes in art
Statues in Mexico City